Lake Manchester Dam is a concrete gravity dam with an un-gated spillway across Cabbage Tree Creek. It is also known as Cabbage Tree Creek Dam. It is in the locality of Lake Manchester, City of Brisbane, Queensland, Australia. The main purpose of the dam is for potable water supply of Brisbane. The impounded reservoir is called Lake Manchester.

Location and features
The primary inflow of the reservoir is Cabbage Tree Creek, not far above its confluence with the Brisbane River to the south-west of the dam. Its original purpose was to supplement supplies when the flow of the Brisbane River was low. Today it is one of a number of dams connected to the South East Queensland Water Grid.

The  dam wall holds back the  reservoir when at full capacity. Initially managed by the Metropolitan Water Supply and Sewerage Board, and then the Brisbane City Council, management of the dam was transferred to Seqwater in July 2008.

History
The Enoggera Dam, the Gold Creek Dam and the Mount Crosby Weir were built to supply water to Brisbane but could not meet growing demand. The designer was Allan Hazen, an American engineer. Construction of the Lake Manchester Dam commenced in 1912 and when it was completed in 1916, it was the fourtholdest dam in Queensland and was originally called the Cabbage Tree Creek Dam. The dam was renamed in 1916 in honour of E. J. T. Manchester, the president of the Metropolitan Water Supply and Sewerage Board. In 1924 the elevation of the bywash was raised which added to the dams capacity.

In October 2005 the dam was reactivated as drought reduced the region's water supply to a critical point. The same year a report claimed that due to leaks and cracks the structure could break in a severe rain storm event. In 2007 the dam's capacity was again raised and connection to the regional water grid was re-established. The Lake Manchester Dam Flood Security Upgrade was a Brisbane City Council project to ensure that the dam met the Australian National Committee on Large Dams (ANCOLD) guidelines for large dams. The project involved strengthening and raising the dam wall for flood security purposes. Work began in early 2007 and was completed in 2008.

Recreational
Recreational activities which are permitted around the dam include barbecuing, camping, horse riding, mountain biking, picnicking and bushwalking.

See also

List of dams in Queensland

References

External links
Pictures- National Library of Australia

Manchester Dam
Dams completed in 1916
South East Queensland
Dams in Queensland
Gravity dams
1916 establishments in Australia